North Gate (formerly Centrum Belvedere) is a high-rise office building in Warsaw, Poland.

Description 
The building is located between Intraco I skyscraper and the Polonia Warszawa football club stadium. In total, the building has approximately 28,146m² of office space. The building has 310 parking spaces.

The ground floor of the building is designed for trade and services, and the rest of the floors are occupied by offices. Floors 11 to 24 are a part of the tower itself.

References 

Śródmieście, Warsaw
Office buildings completed in 2008